Life of the Virgin is a cycle of six large canvases by Vittore Carpaccio, dating to between 1504 and 1508. Originally painted for the sala dell'Albergo in the Scuola di Santa Maria degli Albanesi in Venice, they are now split between several museums. They are mostly in oil, though some of them are in mixed technique.

History
Whilst still working on paintings for the Scuola degli Schiavoni, Carpaccio was summoned by their rivals the Scuola degli Albanesi to produce a cycle on the Life of the Virgin, joint patron saint of their confraternity with saint Gall. The confraternity later passed to the Pistori (i.e. the bakers) but was suppressed in 1808 during the Napoleonic occupation and all its furnishings and paintings sold off and split up, including the Life of the Virgin cycle.

List

Bibliography
  Francesco Valcanover, Vittore Carpaccio, in AA. VV., Pittori del Rinascimento, Scala, Firenze 2007. 
  AA. VV., Brera, guida alla pinacoteca, Electa, Milano 2004.

External links

Collections of the Accademia Carrara
Paintings in the collection of the Pinacoteca di Brera
Paintings in the collection of the Galleria Giorgio Franchetti alla Ca' d'Oro
1500s paintings
Paintings by Vittore Carpaccio
Paintings depicting the Annunciation
Paintings of the Nativity of the Virgin
Paintings of the Presentation of the Virgin at the Temple
Paintings of the Visitation